Bede McCauley (11 June 1911 – 14 October 1994) was an Australian cricketer. He played four first-class matches for New South Wales between 1937/38 and 1938/39.

See also
 List of New South Wales representative cricketers

References

External links
 

1911 births
1994 deaths
Australian cricketers
New South Wales cricketers
Cricketers from Sydney